Georgios Doumtsis (born 4 March 2000) is a Greek professional footballer who plays as a winger.

References

2000 births
Living people
Greek footballers
Greece youth international footballers
Super League Greece players
PAS Giannina F.C. players
Kallithea F.C. players
Association football wingers
Footballers from Florina